Rhoicissus digitata (the baboon grape or the dune grape) is a vigorous, evergreen vine that is indigenous to southern Africa. It is increasingly popular as an ornamental creeper in gardens, and it has a wide range of uses in traditional medicine.

References

External links

 PlantZAfrica.com

Vitaceae
Vines
Flora of Southern Africa
Creepers of South Africa
Plants used in traditional African medicine